The Protram 204 WrAs is a tram produced by the Polish company Protram.

Use
The trams of this type are currently used in Wrocław (thus the "Wr" in the name). They were first delivered to MPK Wrocław in January 2005. Currently there are 12 wagons in operation, they are used in sets of 2.

Tram vehicles of Poland